Ahmad Kamyabi Mask (born 1944) is a writer, translator, publisher and current Professor Emeritus of Modern Drama and Theater of the Faculty of Fine Arts of the University of Tehran. He is a prominent scholar of French Avant-garde theater and influential in the study of Eugène Ionesco and Samuel Beckett.

Biography 
Ahmad Kamyabi Mask was born in Khusf, a village in the vicinity of Birjand in the east of Iran, in 1944 during the Anglo-Soviet occupation of Iran. He attended university in Mashhad, Tehran and Montpellier and taught as a school teacher. Having earned a doctorat de 3e cycle from Paul Valéry University, Montpellier III, he started as a university professor in 1978 in Tehran. He earned his doctorat d'État (state doctorate) in Comparative Literature and Theatrical Studies in 1999 and is "Professor of Humanities" since then.

Kamyabi Mask authored and translated numerous books and essays in French and Persian and self-published them in Paris and with other publishing houses and back in Iran with various publishers, notable among them the University of Tehran Press. Some of his oeuvre has been translated and published to Anglophone readership; one being his book of interviews with Beckett, Last Meeting with Samuel Beckett translated by Janet A. Evans. This book has been translated into numerous other languages as well.

He is also a prolific translator between French and Persian. He translated into Persian many of Eugène Ionesco's plays, who wrote a preface to Kamyabi Mask's Qu'a-t-on fait de Rhinocéros d'Eugène Ionesco à travers le monde?: Allemagne, France, Roumanie, Iran, Japon, U.S.A. and Ionesco et son théâtre. He also translated plays by Jean Genet and Fernando Arrabal and introduced them to Persian readership. He also translated notable Eastern and Persian works into French: a play by Bahram Bayzai, Le huitième voyage de Sindbad along with works of poetry by Buddha, Ahmad Shamlou and Shokouh Mirzadagui.

Kamyabi Mask received the 1991 award of the Association of French Language Writers for his book Qui sont les rhinocéros de Monsieur Bérenger-Eugène Ionesco?. In 2011, he was named Chevalier of the Order of Academic Palms for distinguished contribution to French literature and culture.

Ahmad Kamyabi Mask is known as an eminent critic of Martin Esslin for the colonialist quality of the latter's critique on French Avant-garde theater.

Works 
Some of Kamyabi Mask's books are:

In English Translation

Other Translations

References 

1944 births
People from Birjand
French literary critics
University of Tehran alumni
Living people
Iranian translators
Asian writers in French
French male non-fiction writers